The Headless Horseman is a 1973 Soviet-Cuban Red Western film directed by Vladimir Vajnshtok based on the eponymous novel by Thomas Mayne Reid. The film was the first Soviet Western. It was a box office success, 51,7 million tickets were sold and the picture holds the 33rd place in terms of cinema attendance in the Soviet Union.

Plot
The film takes place in 1850, Texas, United States. Louise, daughter of the wealthy plantation owner Poindexter, master of the hacienda Casa del Corvo, falls in love with a poor mustanger Maurice Gerald. The night their secret rendezvous happens, her brother Henry disappears. Suspicion in murder falls on Gerald, who was found covered in blood, with signs of struggle on the body and on Henry's cloak. One more minute, and an angry crowd would have Gerald lynched, but then the mysterious Headless Horseman appears...

Cast
Oleg Vidov as Maurice Gerald (voiced by Eduard Izotov)
Ludmila Savelyeva as Louise Poindexter
Eslinda Núñez as Isidora Cavarubio
Enriques Santiesteban as El Coyote (voiced by Aleksandr Belyavsky)
Alejandro Lugo as Woodley Poindexter (voiced by Felix Yavorsky)
Aarne Üksküla as Cassius Calhoun (voiced by Aleksey Konsovsky)
Ivan Ivanovich Petrov as Zeb Stump
Rolando Dias Reyes as Major (voiced by Aleksandr Belyavsky)
Aleksandr Milokosty as Henry Poindexter (voiced by Aleksei Zolotnitsky)
Platon Leslie as Pluton (voiced by Daniil Netrebin)

Production
The picture was filmed in Crimea; Yalta and Bilohirsk served as the locations. The manes and tails of horses were painted with silver. Cotton fields were created by decorators scattering ordinary cotton around and the cacti were plastic. The slaves were played by black medical students from Simferopol. Many actors spoke Spanish and the mouth movements do not always match the Russian dubbing.

References

External links

1973 films
1973 Western (genre) films
Films directed by Vladimir Vaynshtok
Lenfilm films
Soviet action films
Soviet adventure films
Cuban drama films
Ostern films
Films set in the 19th century
Films set in Texas